Sandiniés (Spanish pronunciation: [sanði'ɲes]) is a population unit situated in the municipality of Sallent de Gállego (Alto Gállego, Huesca, Aragon, Spain). In 2019, it had a population of 54. It is located at 1294 metres of altitude.

References 

Populated places in the Province of Huesca